Surendra Patwa (born January 19, 1964 in Nimach) is an Indian politician and member of the Bharatiya Janata Party. He is a member of Madhya Pradesh Legislative Assembly from Bhojpur constituency in Raisen district since 2008.

Political career
Surendra Patwa is a former Minister of State with Independent Charges for Ministry of Culture and Tourism in Government of Madhya Pradesh. He is nephew of Sunder Lal Patwa, a former Chief Minister of Madhya Pradesh.

External links

References 

People from Neemuch district
Bharatiya Janata Party politicians from Madhya Pradesh
Living people
1964 births
21st-century Indian politicians
Madhya Pradesh MLAs 2008–2013
Madhya Pradesh MLAs 2013–2018
Madhya Pradesh MLAs 2018–2023